Ira Vannut (born 18 September 1994) is a Belgian former competitive figure skater. She is the 2011 Belgian ladies champion and the first female skater from Belgium to medal on the ISU Junior Grand Prix series, winning a bronze at the 2010 Pokal der Blauen Schwerter.

Career
Vannut began skating by the age of four or five, after attending a public session with her mother. Later, her grandmother signed her up for a club where she began to take skating lessons.

In the 2009–10 season, Vannut competed exclusively on the junior circuit, finishing 11th and 12th at her two Junior Grand Prix assignments and 22nd at the 2010 World Junior Championships.

In 2010–11, Vannut again competed on the Junior Grand Prix series. She finished fourth in her first event and then won the bronze medal at the 2010 Pokal der Blauen Schwerter in Dresden, Germany. After winning her first senior national title, she was named in the Belgian team for the 2011 European Championships. At Europeans, she won the qualifying round, and was ranked seventh overall. Vannut then placed in the top ten at the 2011 World Junior Championships. Concluding her season, she qualified for the free skate at the 2011 World Championships and finished 19th overall.

Personal life
Vannut graduated from high school in 2012. She played tennis and practiced ballet until age 14 when she decided to focus on her skating career.

Programs

Competitive highlights

References

External links 

 

Belgian female single skaters
Living people
1994 births
People from Sint-Truiden
Sportspeople from Limburg (Belgium)
21st-century Belgian women